Flying Solo may refer to:
Flying solo, the first solo flight
A Single person is sometimes referred to as "Flying Solo"
Flying Solo (novel), a 1998 novel by Ralph Fletcher
"Flying Solo", exhibit at The McLoughlin Gallery
Flying Solo, a play by Bruce Venables and Richard Fidler, with Noeline Brown
Flying Solo, a book by Leonard Kriegel

Television
"Flying Solo", an episode of Arctic Air
"Flying Solo", an episode of Major Dad
"Flying Solo", an episode of Doctors, with Lucy Briers

Music
Flying Solo, a 2010 album by Keri Noble
Flying Solo, a 2009 album by Augustin Hadelich
Flying Solo, a 2003 album by Jens Lindemann
"Flyin’ Solo", a song by Poco from the album The Essential Collection (1975–1982)
"Flyin' Solo", a song by Dogs D'Amour from the 1999 album Straight??!!

See also
Solo Flight (disambiguation)
Solo (disambiguation)